The short-snouted thicket rat (Grammomys brevirostris) is a species of rodent endemic to Kenya.

References

Endemic fauna of Kenya
Grammomys
Mammals described in 2008